Gloria Mann was an American pop singer born in Philadelphia, Pennsylvania. Mann scored two hits on the U.S. Billboard Hot 100 in 1955. The first was a cover version of "Earth Angel", which reached number 18. Later that year, "A Teenage Prayer" peaked at number 19; this featured Sid Bass leading the backing orchestra. Both were released on Sound Records. She died in 2001.

Mann's son, Bob Rosenberg, formed the group Will to Power.

In 2003, a compilation album, Don't Call Me Barry: The Best of Gloria Mann was released.

References

Joel Whitburn, The Billboard Book of Top 40 Hits. 7th edn, 2000

Musicians from Philadelphia
American women pop singers
Year of birth missing
Jubilee Records artists
Apex Records artists
2001 deaths
Singers from Pennsylvania